Hiromi Goto (born December 31, 1966 Chiba-ken, Japan) is a Japanese-Canadian writer, editor, and instructor of creative writing.

Life
Goto was born in Chiba'ken, Japan in 1966 and immigrated to Canada with her family in 1969. They lived on the west coast of British Columbia for eight years before moving to Nanton, Alberta, a small town in the foothills of the Rocky Mountains where her father farmed mushrooms. Goto earned her B.A. in English from the University of Calgary in 1989, where she received creative writing instruction from Aritha Van Herk and Fred Wah.

Goto's grandmother told her Japanese stories when she was growing up. Her work is also influenced by her father's life stories in Japan. These stories often featured ghosts and folk creatures such as the kappa — a small creature with a frog's body, a turtle's shell and a bowl-shaped head that holds water. Her writing commonly explores the themes of race, gender and cultural experiences, like eating, while moving between the realms of fantasy, horror  and reality.
 
Her first novel, Chorus of Mushrooms, was the 1995 recipient of the Commonwealth Writers' Prize Best First Book Canada and Caribbean Region' and the co-winner of the Canada-Japan Book Award. It has been released in Israel, Italy, and the United Kingdom.  In 2001, she was awarded the James Tiptree, Jr. Award and was short-listed for the regional Commonwealth Writer's Prize, Best Book Award, the Sunburst Award and the Spectrum Award.

Chorus of Mushrooms is about three generations of Japanese women in Canada, searching for identity in the midst of alienation and an often-hostile host country. The novel explores these characters' diverse, conflicting perspectives towards assimilation into the majority culture, and through the seamless blending of memory, history, and myth, develops a powerful conversation about what it means to belong. Goto speaks to a diasporic experience, on cultural conflicts held on stages from food to hygiene to language, and to the price paid for denying one's origins.

Goto has been the Writer-in-Residence for numerous institutions, including Athabasca University (2012-2013), the University of Alberta (2009-2010), Simon Fraser University (2008), Vancouver Public Library (2007) and Vancouver's Emily Carr University of Art and Design. She was the co-Guest of Honor of the 2014 WisCon science fiction convention in Madison, Wisconsin. where she gave a well-received speech on her experiences as a writer. Goto's graphic novel Shadow Life was selected as the Simon Fraser University Library's One Book One SFU choice in 2022.

Bibliography

The Skin on Our Tongues. Calgary: Absinthe, 1993. (co-editor)
Chorus of Mushrooms. Edmonton: NeWest, 1994.
The Water of Possibility. Regina: Coteau, 2001. 
The Kappa Child. Red Deer, AB: Red Deer, 2001.
Hopeful Monsters. Vancouver: Arsenal Pulp Press, 2004.
Half World. Puffin Canada, 2009. 
Darkest Light. Puffin Canada, 2012. 
Shadow Life. Raincoast, 2021. ISBN 978-1-62672-356-6

References

Further reading

 De Souza, Lyle: Rooted-transnationalism and the representational function of food in Hiromi Goto's "Chorus of Mushrooms". Contemporary Japan 29 (2), 2017 10.1080/18692729.2017.1351023
 Diana Thiesen: Transkulturalismus in Hiromi Goto's "Chorus of Mushrooms" and Wayson Choy's "The Jade Peony", Thesis for Magister degree, Zentrum für Kanada-Studien ZKS, Universität Trier 2017, Chair Ralf Hertel

External links

 Goto at English-Canadian writers, Athabasca University, with links, e.g.Words Like Buckshot: Taking Aim at Notions of Nation in Hiromi Goto's "Chorus of Mushrooms", by Mari Sasano. Published in Open Letter in 1998

1966 births
Living people
Canadian science fiction writers
People from Chiba Prefecture
Japanese emigrants to Canada
Writers from Vancouver
Canadian women novelists
Canadian writers of Asian descent
Women science fiction and fantasy writers
Canadian lesbian writers
Canadian LGBT novelists
20th-century Canadian novelists
21st-century Canadian novelists
21st-century Canadian women writers
20th-century Canadian women writers
Lesbian novelists
20th-century Canadian LGBT people
21st-century Canadian LGBT people